CHInoyTV or CHI FCTV (Traditional Chinese: 菲華電視台, Simplified Chinese: 菲华电视台, Pinyin: Fēi huá diànshìtái, English: Filipino Chinese Television, Hokkien: Hui hôa tiān sī tai, Cantonese: Fēi wàh dihn sih tòih), is a weekly television program of CNN Philippines, with Fil-Chi Media Productions as its production venture, that airs every Saturday at 8:00 – 8:30 pm (04:00–04:30 UTC) and encode airing every Sunday at 10:00 – 10:30 am (06:00–06:30 UTC).

CHInoyTV traces its roots to Chi which was aired on IBC from October 25, 2009 to 2010, Net 25 from 2010 to 2014, PTV from June 29, 2014 to March 5, 2017 and ANC from March 11, 2017 to 2020. The show is converted into the present HDTV format.

On its third season, CHInoyTV unveiled its new logo, welcomes new set of hosts, and introduced new segments. During the third season, CHInoyTV also launched the first reality business show on free TV dubbed as CHInoypreneur Challenge.

The show mainly uses three languages; namely: English, Filipino, and Mandarin Chinese (however with English subtitles) during CHInoy Plus.

Segments

Current segments
CHInoy Active
CHInoy Access
CHInoy Basics
CHInoy Charts
CHInoy Chow
CHInoy Community News
CHInoy Fortune
CHInoy Gives
CHInoy Living
CHInoy Profile
CHInoy Plus
CHInoy Roots
CHInoy Style
CHInoy Travel
CHInoy Wellness
Wokking Chef

Former segments
CHInoy Speak
CHInoypreneur Challenge
CHInoy Star Ka Na!

Hosts

Current hosts
Doreen Yu
Wilson Lee Flores 
Tim Yap 
Nicole Cordoves 
Rob Cham
Patricia Ngo
Janeena Chan 
DJ Stan Sy

Former hosts

Gretchen Ho
Dorenett Yu
Jayson Alexander Kiong
Kathy Ordoñez
Sherine Ann Koa
Shirley Chu
Willord Chua
Valerie Tan
Carolyn Batay
Christopher Wong
Jerome Go
Nicole Facal
Stanley Chi
IMC Kavino
Alice Lee-Chua
Benedict Yujeco
Jason Lowell Tomas
Jelyn Nataly Chong
Kendrick Chua
Lesley Tomas
Mary Grace Khu
Paul Erik Tiu
Stephanie Obiles
Adriel Cheng
Charmaine Hong
Charmeuse Tan
Diane Ellice Yu
Ellen Pua
Honey Lynne Sy
Jeannielyn Cheng
Marc Spencer Sy
Marianne Karyl Ko
Sandy Mu
YanFang Zhu
Mr. Chinoy

References

Chinese-Filipino culture
Philippine television shows
Intercontinental Broadcasting Corporation original programming
Net 25 original programming
People's Television Network original programming
ABS-CBN News Channel original programming
CNN Philippines original programming
2009 Philippine television series debuts
2020 Philippine television series endings
2021 Philippine television series debuts
2000s Philippine television series
2010s Philippine television series
2020s Philippine television series
English-language television shows
Filipino-language television shows
Chinese-language television shows